Romeroa is a genus of plant in the Bignoniaceae family. Its only species is Romeroa verticillata. It is endemic to Colombia.

References

Bignoniaceae
Bignoniaceae genera
Taxonomy articles created by Polbot
Monotypic Lamiales genera